Henry Coke Morgan Jr. (February 8, 1935 – May 1, 2022) was a United States district judge of the United States District Court for the Eastern District of Virginia.

Education and career
Born in Norfolk, Virginia, Morgan received a Bachelor of Science degree from Washington and Lee University in 1957 and a Juris Doctor from Washington and Lee University School of Law in 1960. He was a Reserve Lieutenant in the United States Army from 1958 to 1959. He was an assistant city attorney of Norfolk from 1960 to 1963, and was then in private practice in Virginia Beach, Virginia from 1963 to 1992.

Federal judicial service
On October 22, 1991, Morgan was nominated by President George H. W. Bush to a new seat on the United States District Court for the Eastern District of Virginia created by 104 Stat. 5089. He was confirmed by the United States Senate on April 8, 1992, and received his commission on April 13, 1992. He assumed senior status on February 8, 2004. His judicial service ended with his death on May 1, 2022.

References

Sources
 

1935 births
2022 deaths
Judges of the United States District Court for the Eastern District of Virginia
Military personnel from Norfolk, Virginia
People from Virginia Beach, Virginia
United States district court judges appointed by George H. W. Bush
20th-century American judges
United States Army officers
Washington and Lee University alumni
Washington and Lee University School of Law alumni
21st-century American judges